Poizdów  is a village in the administrative district of Gmina Kock, within Lubartów County, Lublin Voivodeship, in eastern Poland.

The village has a population of 364.

References

Villages in Lubartów County